Eric Wood (13 March 1920 – 2000) was an English footballer who played as a wing half for Rochdale.

In 1939, Wood was on the books of Bolton Wanderers but never made a first team appearance, due to the outbreak of World War II.
 
Wood first played for Rochdale in the war-time league and also the FA Cup on its return in 1945-46. He made his league debut in the 1946-47 season and remained at Rochdale throughout his career, clocking up 148 appearances and 15 goals. He retired in 1951.

Wood died in 2000.

References

Bolton Wanderers F.C. players
Rochdale A.F.C. players
1920 births
2000 deaths
Footballers from Bolton
English footballers
Association football midfielders